Hamerow is a surname. Notable people with the surname include:

Helena Hamerow (born 1971), American archaeologist
Theodore S. Hamerow (1920–2013), American historian